BLSS may refer to:

Bioregenerative life support system, an artificial ecosystem consisting of many complex symbiotic relationships
Boon Lay Secondary School, a secondary school in Jurong West, Singapore